The 2009 Open Castilla y León was a professional tennis tournament played on outdoor hard courts. It was the twenty fourth edition of the tournament which was part of the Tretorn SERIE+ of the 2009 ATP Challenger Tour. It took place in Segovia, Spain between 3 and 9 August 2009.

Singles entrants

Seeds

 Rankings are as of July 27, 2009.

Other entrants
The following players received wildcards into the singles main draw:
  Roberto Bautista Agut
  Jorge Hernando Ruano
  Feliciano López
  Quino Muñoz

The following players received a Special Exempt into the main draw:
  Iñigo Cervantes-Huegun
  Illya Marchenko

The following players received entry from the qualifying draw:
  Grigor Dimitrov
  Sergio Gutiérrez Ferrol
  Jean-Noel Insausti
  Fernando Vicente

Champions

Singles

 Feliciano López def.  Adrian Mannarino, 6–3, 6–4

Doubles

 Nicolas Mahut /  Édouard Roger-Vasselin def.  Sergiy Stakhovsky /  Lovro Zovko, 6–7(4), 6–3, [10–8]

External links
Official website
ITF Search 
2009 Draws